Inside the Fire is a 1984 album by Rita Coolidge and was released on the A&M Records label.  This would prove to be Rita's last studio album with her longtime label, A&M Records. The album features the top 15 adult contemporary hit "Something Said Love" and the Richard Kerr/Will Jennings ballad "I Can't Afford That Feeling Anymore". The album has yet to be released on CD.

Track listing

Side one
"Hit Me on the Loveside" (J.C. Crowley, Marcy Levy) – 4:07
"Do You Believe in Love" (Graham Lyle) – 3:34
"I Can't Afford That Feeling Anymore" (Richard Kerr, Will Jennings) – 3:49
"Games" (Vince Melamed, Andrea Farber) – 3:30
"Wishing Star" (Vince Melamed, Chris Thompson) – 3:40

Side two
"I'm Comin' Home" (Charlie Williams, Danny Chauncey, David Brown) – 3:55
"Something Said Love" (Wood Newton, Jerry Michael) – 3:36
"Love From Tokyo" (Kenji Sawada, Yoshiko Miura, Ralph F. McCarthy) – 3:42
"Survivor" (Priscilla Coolidge, Mary Unobsky, Danny Ironstone) – 3:29
"Love Is Muddy Water" (Jim Hunt, Arnold Goldstein) – 3:46

Personnel
Rita Coolidge – vocals
Rick Vito, Snuffy Walden, Steve Farris, Josh Leo – guitar
Kurtis Teel – bass
Mike Utley – keyboards, piano
Bill Payne – synthesizer
Thom Mooney – drums
Paulinho da Costa – percussion
George Wesly Perry – bass on "Something Said Love"
Chet McCracken – drums on "Something Said Love"
Mitchell Froom – electric flute on "Games", synthesizer on "Wishing Star"
Jimmy "Z" Zavala – harmonica on "I'm Comin' Home"
Vince Melamed – synthesizer on "Love From Tokyo"
Albhy Galuten – strings arranged and conducted on "I Can't Afford That Feeling Anymore" and "Something Said Love"
Arnold McCuller, David Lasley, JoAnn Harris, Sherlie Matthews, Ce Ce Bullard, Judi Brown, Carmen Grillo, Bonnie Bramlett – backing vocals

Rita Coolidge albums
1984 albums
Albums produced by Tom Dowd
A&M Records albums